Oleg Ivanovich Sanko (born 6 September 1970) is a former Russian professional footballer.

Club career
He made his professional debut in the Soviet Second League in 1989 for FC Shakhtyor Shakhty. He played 2 games in the UEFA Intertoto Cup 1999 for FC Rostselmash Rostov-on-Don.

References

1970 births
People from Shakhty
Living people
Soviet footballers
Association football midfielders
Russian footballers
FC Rostov players
FC Zhemchuzhina Sochi players
FC Lokomotiv Nizhny Novgorod players
FC Fakel Voronezh players
FC Chernomorets Novorossiysk players
FC SKA Rostov-on-Don players
FC Nika Krasny Sulin players
FC Taganrog players
Russian Premier League players
Sportspeople from Rostov Oblast